Non canto più is a 1945 Italian comedy film directed by Riccardo Freda and starring Enzo Fiermonte, Vera Bergman and Paola Borboni. The film originally began shooting several years earlier, but its production was heavily delayed due to wartime conditions and it wasn't released until 1945.

Cast
 Enzo Fiermonte as Il tenore Guido Revi 
 Vera Bergman as Lisa Baratti  
 Paola Borboni as L'impresaria teatrale Greta Arden  
 Virgilio Riento as Roberto  
 Giuseppe Porelli as Adolfo  
 Olinto Cristina as Carlo Baratti, padre di Lisa  
 Arturo Bragaglia as Il commissario  
 Lamberto Picasso as L'ispettore Carter 
 Agnese Dubbini as La cuoca di casa Baratti 
 Giuseppe Pierozzi as Il fattore

Production
Following Freda's directorial debut with Don Cesare di Bazan, he found his next project he wanted to work on was rejected he wanted to make L'atleta di cristallo, a film about the behind the scenes world of boxing, was rejected. Freda stated that his next film  Non canto più then developed after he met Leo Longanesi and Mario Pannunzio at Rome's Imperiale theater. While there he met with a producer who had dreams about developing a film with American actors Gary Cooper and Ingrid Bergman. Freda said the production led its course without the American actors and what he called "some unknown, nondescript Italian thesp...[...] Acoordin to [the producer], I would direct a film with Gary Cooper, and found myself with Enzo Fiermonte, the contender for the world boxing championship and a pathetic actor." Fiermonte had abandoned boxing in 1934 and after attempting car racing, he went into acting in 1941. Freda developed the script for the film with Stefano Vanzina and Vittorio Metz.
 
Non canto più was shot in 1943 at Titanus Studios in Rome. Despite being filmed in 1943, the film was shelved for two years due to fall of fascism in Italy, Benito Mussolini's arrest and the armistice.

Release
Non canto più was distributed theatrically in Italy by Variety Film on 30 September 1945.

References

Bibliography

External links 
 

1945 films
Italian comedy films
1945 comedy films
1940s Italian-language films
Films directed by Riccardo Freda
Italian black-and-white films
1940s Italian films